Arctia gurkoi is a moth of the family Erebidae. It was described by Vladimir Viktorovitch Dubatolov in 2004. It is found in Pakistan (Azad Kashmir) and possibly Xinjiang, China.

The species of the genus Oroncus, including this one, were moved to Arctia as a result of phylogenetic research published by Rönkä et al. in 2016.

References

Spilosomina
Moths described in 2004
Moths of Asia